The 1908 VMI Keydets football team represented the Virginia Military Institute (VMI) in their 18th season of organized football. VMI went 4–2 in a fairly short season under head coach Charles Roller.

Schedule

On October 13, when VMI played Staunton Military, Charles Roller was away, being replaced by assistant coach Pete Krebs, who also coached the basketball team that year.
On October 31, VMI's George Cook Ferebee died from a blow to the head during the Keydets game against Roanoke College. The game was stopped immediately when his death was announced, after he was carried away to a nearby hospital.

References

VMI
VMI Keydets football seasons
VMI Keydets football